The Music Box Society International (MBSI) is a non-profit organization dedicated to the enjoyment, study and preservation of all automatic musical instruments. Founded in 1949, MBSI now numbers several thousand members with representation in 50 US states and nineteen other countries.  It focuses on music boxes of all sizes, from small, hand-held wind-up boxes, to fairground organs or room sized orchestrions, including musical clocks and snuff boxes, singing bird boxes, player pianos (reproducing pianos, nickelodeons), and automatic musical instruments of any kind.

External links
The Musical Box Society International

Mechanical musical instruments